Claudia Stănescu (born 13 January 1976) is a Romanian backstroke swimmer. She competed in three events at the 1992 Summer Olympics. Now teaching Physiology at University of Arizona.

References

External links
 

1976 births
Living people
Romanian female backstroke swimmers
Olympic swimmers of Romania
Swimmers at the 1992 Summer Olympics
Place of birth missing (living people)